is a Japanese long-distance runner who specializes in the marathon.

He became Asian marathon champion in 2002. He won the bronze medal at the 2006 Asian Games, and finished sixth at the 2007 World Championships in Athletics, behind countryfellow Tsuyoshi Ogata. He was qualified for the 2008 Olympic Games, but did not start.

His personal best time is 2:08:36 hours, achieved in March 2008 at the Ōtsu Marathon. In the half marathon his personal best time is 1:02:24 hours, achieved in March 2007 in Yamaguchi. He also has 28:34.63 minutes in the 10,000 metres, 13:49.95 minutes in the 5000 metres and 3:48.90 minutes in the 1500 metres.

International competitions

References

1983 births
Living people
Japanese male long-distance runners
People from Sakai, Osaka
Asian Games medalists in athletics (track and field)
Athletes (track and field) at the 2006 Asian Games
Japanese male marathon runners
Asian Games bronze medalists for Japan
Medalists at the 2006 Asian Games